The Leepa Valley is an arable valley situated in the Hattian Bala District of Azad Jammu and Kashmir, Pakistan. The valley is divided into the Nowkot, Kasirkot, Dao Khan, Leepa,Terye Rath and Chananian sectors.

History 
Leepa Valley was formerly part of Karnah tehsil of Kupwara district in Jammu and Kashmir. The valley is now part of Jhelum Valley District in Azad Kashmir, Pakistan. It has been an area of strife among the two neighboring countries.

Population
The population of Leepa Valley is about 80,000.

Geography
Snowfall occurs regularly throughout the year.

Rice and apple and walnut fields can be found frequently in the whole valley. The Line of Control, which separates it from Jammu and Kashmir, can be seen from anywhere while standing in the valley from east to west. Its lush green river fields in summer and typical wooden kashmiri houses present a wonderful view to the tourists.

Languages
The main language which is spoken in the valley is Kashmiri, followed by Pahari-Pothwari and Gojari.

See also
Tourism in Azad Kashmir

References

External links
https://ajktourism.gov.pk/leepa-valley
Leepa Valley - Emerging Pakistan 

Jhelum Valley District
Valleys of Azad Kashmir